Events from the year 1684 in Ireland.

Incumbent
Monarch: Charles II

Events
February 18 –  "Court of grace" appointed to enquire into tithes on land.
March 25 – Royal Hospital Kilmainham is completed in Dublin as a home for retired soldiers, to the design of Sir William Robinson.
Jeremiah O'Donovan's landownings in County Cork are erected by royal letters patent into the Manor of the Leap.
The regiment which becomes the Royal Irish Regiment is formed from independent companies by Arthur Forbes, Viscount Granard (who is elevated to Earl of Granard this year).
Historian Ruaidhrí Ó Flaithbheartaigh (Roderic O'Flaherty) compiles his Chorographical description of West or Iar Connacht for William Molyneux.

Births
February 20 – Edward Bayly, landowner and politician (d. 1741)

Deaths
February 25 – Richard Nugent, 2nd Earl of Westmeath, noble and military commander (b. 1621/3)
July – Sir George Downing, 1st Baronet, Anglo-Irish soldier, statesman, and diplomat (b. 1623)
Murrough Ó Laoí, physician.

References

 
1680s in Ireland
Ireland
Years of the 17th century in Ireland